Peasants' Party or Peasant Party may refer to one of the following political parties:
Bavarian Peasants' League
Belarusian Peasant Party
Bessarabian Peasants' Party
Croatian Democratic Peasant Party
Croatian Peasant Party 
Croatian Peasant Party of Stjepan Radić
Peasants' Party of Italy
Peasant Party of Russia
Peasants' Party of Slovakia
Peasant Party (Taiwan)
Peasants' Party (Romania)
National Peasants' Party
Socialist Peasants' Party
People's Peasant Party, Serbia
Polish People's Party
Ukrainian Peasant Democratic Party
Workers' and Peasants' Party (Liechtenstein)

See also
Agrarian Party (disambiguation)
Democratic Peasants' Party (disambiguation)

de:Bauernpartei